Deutschfeistritz is a municipality in the district of Graz-Umgebung in the Austrian state of Styria.

Population

Personalities
Vincenz Liechtenstein, Austrian politician, died unexpectedly on 14 January 2008 at his house in Deutschfeistritz.

References

Cities and towns in Graz-Umgebung District